Grains of Sand is the fourth studio album issued by gothic rock band The Mission, released in October 1990. A number of the tracks were originally recorded for their previous album, Carved in Sand, but not included on that release. Also included are acoustic versions of previously released songs and the Andy Partridge co-produced single 'Hands Across the Ocean'.

The album was expanded with the Metal Guru's material and included in the two disc reissue of Carved in Sand, released in 2008.

Track listing
Except where noted, all music by Adams, Brown, Hinkler, Hussey and words by Hussey

 "Hands Across the Ocean" – 3:49
 "The Grip of Disease" – 4:12
 "Divided We Fall" – 3:40
 "Mercenary" (M. Brown, W. Hussey) – 2:50
 "Mr. Pleasant" (Ray Davies) – 2:50
 "Kingdom Come (Forever and Again)" – 4:57
 "Heaven Sends You" – 4:54
"Sweet Smile of a Mystery" – 3:55
 "Tower of Strength (Casbah Mix)" - 4:30
 "Butterfly on a Wheel (Troubadour Mix)" - 4:29
 "Love" (John Lennon) – 1:51
 "Bird of Passage" – 6:28

Personnel 
The Mission
 Craig Adams – bass guitar
 Mick Brown – drums
 Simon Hinkler – guitar, keyboards
 Wayne Hussey – vocals, guitar
Produced by
 Andy Partridge with additional production and remix by Wayne Hussey (1)
 Tim Palmer (2, 3, 8)
 Wayne Hussey (4, 9, 10, 11)
 Tim Palmer & Chris Sheldon (5)
 Julian Mendelsohn & The Mission (6)
 Wayne Hussey & Chris Sheldon (7, 12)

References

1990 albums
The Mission (band) albums
Albums produced by Tim Palmer
Mercury Records albums